The Telescopes are an English noise, space rock, dream pop and psychedelic band, formed in 1987 by Stephen Lawrie, David Fitzgerald and Joanna Doran that drew influence from artists such as Suicide, The Velvet Underground, Trite and The 13th Floor Elevators. They have a total of eleven released albums including their debut, Taste, released in 1989.

History
Their debut release was a split flexi disc with Loop on the Cheree label in 1988, which was given away with the Sowing Seeds fanzine.  There followed their debut single, "Kick the Wall", and "7th# Disaster" also on Cheree Records.  They moved to the American What Goes On Records and released their debut album Taste and "The Perfect Needle" single which is perhaps their most famous song.  A live album appeared on Fierce Records and following What Goes On’s bankruptcy they signed to Creation Records.  In contrast to Taste'''s noise-rock, a more laid back sound followed, described by journalist Alexis Petridis as having "an almost fragile sense of elegance and melody", and the band scraped the lower reaches of the UK Singles Chart with the single "Flying", and released The Telescopes, their second album, in 1992. Lawrie explained the change in direction: "Your idea of perfection changes as you move on. I think we still hold the same approach to our music now, we still try just as many mad ideas, it's just a lot more subtle and works to a different end".

In 2002 they made a surprise return with Third Wave on Double Agent Records.  In 2005 they released their fourth album #4 on their own Antenna Records.  By this time they were a much more experimental band specialising in electronic soundscapes. In July 2011, the band were invited by Portishead to perform at the ATP I'll Be Your Mirror at Alexandra Palace in London, where they performed songs from their debut album. An event repeated at Austin Psych Fest 2012 curated by The Reverberation Appreciation Society.

In April 2012 came two new singles, the first a drone version of Nick Drake's "Black Eyed Dog" on the Trensmat label. The second, a new composition entitled "We See Magic and We Are Neutral, Unnecessary", was a flexi-postcard release on The Dream Machine label. A 2013 West coast tour of the US resulted in a new album "HARM" recorded live with the US-tour version of the band's lineup, consisting mostly of shoegaze band LSD and the Search For God, including Ricky Maymi of The Brian Jonestown Massacre. This album continued the band's drone experimentation, and was released by label Neon Sigh following their help in coordinating the tour. Further US tours followed in 2014 and 2016.

In 2015, the Hidden Fields album was released by German label Tapete Records. It was described by AllMusic as shoegaze and noise pop, but more song-based than recent releases.Exploding Head Syndrome was released in 2019 on Tapete Records. Dagger says "if you find beauty in churning guitars, a groggy organ and Lawrie's half-mumbled lyrics (like I do) then you’ll find Exploding Head Syndrome to be the Raquel Welch of the year."

Original guitarist David Fitzgerald died on December 17, 2020, aged 54 of cancer.

Discography
Studio albums
 Taste (1989)
 The Telescopes (1992, later reissued as # Untitled Second)
 Third Wave (2002)
 #4 (2005)
 Hungry Audio Tapes (2006)
 Infinite Suns (2008)
 Harm (2013)
 Hidden Fields (2015)
 As Light Return (2017)
 Stone Tape (2017)
 Exploding Head Syndrome (2019)
 Songs of Love and Revolution (2021)
 #4 (2022)
 Experimental Health (2023)

Singles

 "Forever Close Your Eyes" (1988) (split 7-inch flexi-disc with Loop)
 "Kick the Wall" (1989)
 "7th# Disaster" (1989)
 "The Perfect Needle" (1989)
 "To Kill A Slow Girl Walking" (1990)
 "Precious Little" (1990)
 "Everso" (1990)
 "Celeste" (1991)
 "Flying" (1991)
 "Where the Sky Is Low" (2003) (split 7-inch with Füxa)
 "Mooga Destroya" (2003) (split 7-inch with Lo Casta)
 "Winter EP" (2004)
 "Live At Audioscope" (2005) (split 10-inch with Vibracathedral Orchestra)
 "Night Terrors" (2006)
 "Psychic Viewfinder" (2007)
 "Another Whip" (2007)
 "Landing Shadows" (2011)
 "Black Eyed Dog" (2012)
 "We See Magic and We Are Neutral, Unnecessary" (2012) (7-inch flexi-postcard)
 "I Wanna Be Your Dog" (2015) (split 10-inch with A Place To Bury Strangers)
 "Thrown" (2015) (split 7-inch with Deadly Cradle Death)
 "The Telescopes | Flavor Crystals" (2016) (split 12-inch with Flavor Crystals)
 "Strange Waves" (2019)

Live albums
 Trade Mark Of Quality (1990)
 Live. Aftertaste (2011)

Compilation albums
 As Approved by the Committee (2003)
 Premonitions 1989-1991 (2003)
 Altered Perception (2004)
 Singles Compilation 1989-1991 (2008)
 Singles No. 2 (2009)
 Splashdown - The Complete Creation Recordings 1990-1992'' (2015)

References

External links
 Antennarecords.com

Creation Records artists
English space rock musical groups
British shoegaze musical groups
English alternative rock groups
Musical groups established in 1987